The 2014 NCAA Division I softball season, play of college softball in the United States organized by the National Collegiate Athletic Association (NCAA) at the Division I level, began in February 2014.  The season progressed through the regular season, many conference tournaments and championship series, and concluded with the 2014 NCAA Division I softball tournament and 2014 Women's College World Series.  The Women's College World Series, consisting of the eight remaining teams in the NCAA Tournament and held in Oklahoma City at ASA Hall of Fame Stadium, ended on June 3, 2014.

Conference standings

Women's College World Series
The 2014 NCAA Women's College World Series took place from May 29 to June 3, 2014 in Oklahoma City.

Season leaders
Batting
Batting average: .493 – Courtney Ceo, Oregon Ducks
RBIs: 83 – Maddie O'Brien, Florida State Seminoles
Home runs: 25 – Alex Hugo, Georgia Bulldogs

Pitching
Wins: 38-7 – Lacey Waldrop, Florida State Seminoles
ERA: 0.94 (26 ER/192.1 IP) – Hannah Campbell, South Alabama Jaguars
Strikeouts: 354 – Aimee Creger, Tulsa Golden Hurricane

Records
Junior class doubles:
28 – Emilee Koerner, Notre Dame Fighting Irish

Awards

USA Softball Collegiate Player of the Year:
Lacey Waldrop, FSU Seminoles

Honda Sports Award Softball:
Madison Shipman, Tennessee Lady Vols

NFCA National Freshman of the Year:
Annie Aldrete, Tennessee Lady Vols

Kasey Cooper, Auburn Tigers

All America Teams
The following players were members of the All-American Teams.

First Team

Second Team

Third Team

References

External links